Parancistrocerus leionotus is a species of potter wasp in the family Vespidae.

Ecology
Unlike most related species, this wasp uses small cavities in rocks or concrete as nest sites.

References

Potter wasps